The list of Roman cisterns offers an overview over Ancient Roman cisterns. Freshwater reservoir were commonly set up at the termini of aqueducts and their branch lines, supplying urban households, agricultural estates, imperial palaces, thermae or naval bases of the Roman navy.

Cisterns

Notes

See also 
Roman architecture
Roman engineering
Roman technology

References

Sources

External links 

Roman Aqueducts – Basins in Roman aqueducts
Traianus – Technical investigation of Roman public works

 List of Roman cisterns
Cisterns
 Roman cisterns
 Roman cisterns
 Roman cisterns